Eoin Christopher Macken (born 21 February 1983) is an Irish actor, director, and model.

Macken has modelled for Abercrombie and Fitch, Ralph Lauren, and GQ, and has appeared in films such as Resident Evil, Close, Killing Jesus, and Centurion. He has appeared on television in series such as RTÉ's Fair City as Gavin Cluxton and in BBC series Merlin as Sir Gwaine.  In 2021 Macken stars in the NBC drama La Brea. In addition, Macken has directed several feature films: Christian Blake in 2008, Dreaming For You, The Inside and Cold, and Here Are the Young Men. Macken also directed the documentary The Fashion of Modelling. He starred in the NBC series The Night Shift as T.C. Callahan, and Netflix show Nightflyers as Karl D'Branin.

Early life
Macken was born in Dublin. He has two sisters. Macken was studying for a Bachelor of Science degree in psychology at University College Dublin when he began his modeling and acting career at the university's fashion show in 2002 and 2003, after which he joined the model agency Morgan the Agency and was selected as the face of the Abercrombie and Fitch 2003 campaign. He also modeled for Ralph Lauren.

Career

Macken's first major film role was in Studs in 2005, which starred Brendan Gleeson and Emmett J. Scanlan. He also appeared in the role of drug dealer Gavin Cluxton in several episodes of the TV series Fair City in 2008.

Macken wrote and edited his debut feature film Christian Blake, which premiered at the Mid Ulster Film Festival 2008, before playing in the 2008 Galway Film Fleadh. It was released on 19 May 2009 with Celebrity Distribution and the sales company Around The Scenes Inc. He co-wrote and directed the song and video for Una Healy's song "Don't Leave Me Alone". It was the title track for the no-budget indie film, for which Healy wrote much of the soundtrack.

In 2008, he wrote, directed, and acted in his second feature film, Dreaming For You. The film featured a soundtrack composed by Dublin band, The Evora. The film was selected for the 2007 Los Angeles Short Film Festival, and for the 2009 Galway Film Fleadh.

In 2009–10, Macken had roles in the BBC drama Small Island (playing an American soldier named Calhoon), in Neil Marshall's film Centurion, and in the second series of RTÉ's Raw. He appeared in Storyland, as well as Lee Cronin's film Through The Night, opposite Nora Jane Noone, and Siren opposite Anna Skellern. He directed an hour-length documentary on the Irish fashion industry The Fashion of Modelling which screened on RTÉ 2 on 24 May 2009.

Between 2010 and 2012, Macken played the recurring character of Gwaine (loosely based on the image of Gawain) in the BBC One TV series Merlin. He appeared in four episodes of the third series and all episodes of the fourth and fifth.

In October 2012 Macken completed shooting for Cold, a feature film released in 2013 written and directed by Macken, and he stars in the film alongside former co-star, Tom Hopper. The plot centres around two disconnected English brothers who are outcasts in a small village in the west of Ireland. Drawn back together by the unexpected death of their father, they are immediately at odds with each other until they find a girl dumped in the moors. The film was partially crowdfunded through an Indiegogo campaign. The film was later released under the name Leopard.

After directing a number of independent features, in 2018 Macken adapted Rob Doyle's award-winning novel Here Are the Young Men into a screenplay, and directed the resulting film. He is set to star alongside Elisha Cuthbert the horror movie The Cellar.

Filmography

Film

Television

References

External links

1983 births
Living people
Alumni of University College Dublin
Irish male film actors
Irish film directors
Irish male models
People educated at Belvedere College